Paul Demange (12 April 1901 – 28 November 1983) was a French film actor who had roles in over 200 films from 1933 to 1977.

Selected filmography
Bach the Detective (1936)
 Marinella (1936)
 The Lover of Madame Vidal (1936)
 Excursion Train (1936)
 The Flame (1936)
The Man of the Hour (1937)
 Three Waltzes (1938)
 His Uncle from Normandy (1939)
 Whirlwind of Paris (1939)
 The Last of the Six (1941)
 The Black Diamond (1941)
 Mademoiselle Swing (1942) 
 The Guardian Angel (1942)
 Malaria (1943)
The Woman Who Dared (1944)
St. Val's Mystery (1945)
 The Last Metro (1945)
 Pamela (1945)
 The Black Cavalier (1945)
Back Streets of Paris (1946)
Her Final Role (1946)
Jericho (1946)
Roger la Honte (1946)
Women's Games (1946)
 Sylvie and the Ghost (1946)
Man About Town (1947)
Cab Number 13 (1948)
 Dilemma of Two Angels (1948)
 Night Express (1948)
 Doctor Laennec (1949)
 Millionaires for One Day (1949)
 The Red Angel (1949)
 The Treasure of Cantenac (1950)
 Sending of Flowers (1950)
My Wife Is Formidable (1951)
 Good Enough to Eat (1951)
 The Road to Damascus (1952)
 Love Is Not a Sin (1952)
 This Age Without Pity (1952)
 My Husband Is Marvelous (1952)
 The Sparrows of Paris (1953)
 The Lottery of Happiness (1953)
Boum sur Paris (1953)
 My Brother from Senegal (1953)
 The Fighting Drummer (1953)
 Little Jacques (1953)
 Darling Anatole  (1954)
 Leguignon the Healer (1954)
 Quay of Blondes (1954)
 Madame du Barry (1954)
 Thirteen at the Table (1955)
 The Babes Make the Law (1955)
 Meeting in Paris (1956)
If Paris Were Told to Us (1956)
 The Adventures of Gil Blas (1956)
 The Babes in the Secret Service (1956)
 It's All Adam's Fault (1958)
Head Against the Wall (1959)
The Seven Deadly Sins (1962)

References

External links

1901 births
1983 deaths
People from Mirecourt
French male film actors
20th-century French male actors